The central business district of Bangalore is the area within a 6 km radius around Vidhan Soudha. This is the center of the city and core commercial area of Bangalore which was founded by Kempegowda of the Vijayanagara Empire. Most of the land is used by commercial establishments and the Indian Army with plans of skyscrapers under works. It has multiple high-rises including World Trade Center Bangalore and UB Tower. It also includes heritage properties like the Bangalore Fort and the Bangalore Pete.

The Collection in UB City is one of the first luxury shopping malls of South India. The land in CBD is expensive; Brigade Road and MG Road are amongst the most expensive in India. It also houses many other high streets including Commercial Street and Church Street as well as the Karnataka Film Chamber of Commerce. CBD is a tourist attraction as there are parks, government offices, educational institutions, business houses and hotels, shopping destinations, stadiums, museums, temples, mosques, churches, art galleries and entertainment zones.

Notable roads

 MG Road
 Brigade Road
 Magrath Road
 Richmond Road
 Kasturba Road
 Commercial Street
 Church Street
 Lavelle Road
 J C Road
 Queens Road
 Cubbon Road
 Millers Road
 Cunningham Road
 Museum Road
 Kamaraj Road
 Infantry Road
 Dickenson Road
 Raj Bhavan Road
 St. Mark's Road
 Vittal Mallya Road
 Residency Road
 Convent Road
 Raja Ram Mohan Roy Road
 Mosque Road
 Hayes Road
 Central Street
 Palace Road
 St. John's Church Road
 Jumma Masjid Road
 Ali Askar Road
 Bowring Hospital Road
 Ulsoor Road

Important landmarks 
Vidhana Soudha (State legislature of Karnataka)
Freedom Park
National Gallery of Modern Art
Department of Industries and Commerce
National Bank For Agriculture And Rural Development
State Bank of India - International Branch
Jawaharlal Nehru Planetarium
Karnataka Power Transmission Corporation
National Aerospace Laboratories
India Meteorological Department
Bharat Earth Movers Limited (head office)
Hindustan Aeronautics Limited Corporate Office
General Thimmayya National Academy Of Adventure
Raj Bhavan Karnataka
Madras Sappers
Board of Technical Examinations
Department of Archaeology and Museums
Haj Committee of India
Karnataka State Central Library
Reserve Bank of India
Bangalore Palace
Lal Bagh Botanical Gardens
Bangalore Fort
Vikasa Soudha
Commissionerate of Social Welfare Department
UB City
Department of Information and Public Relations
Central Revenue Building
Parachute Regiment - Indian Army
Karnataka and Kerala Sub Area HQ of Army
Kempegowda Majestic Metro Station (the largest station in Asia)
Cubbon Park
Press Club of Bengaluru
Karnataka Government Museum
General Cariappa Memorial Park
India Post General Post Office
Indira Gandhi Musical Fountain Park
Karnataka Golf Association
Karnataka Chitrakala Parishath
Bangalore Turf Club
Ulsoor Lake
Russel Market
Bangalore Club
Bangalore Cantonment railway station
Bangalore City railway station
Venkatappa Art Gallery
Bangalore Police Headquarters
Central Press Information Bureau, Bangalore
Fun World Amusement Park
Traffic Headquarters
St. Mary's Basilica
ISCKON Temple Bangalore
Jamia Masjid
Bangalore Town Hall
Bowring Institute
Karnataka Housing Board
BESCOM Corporate Office
BWSSB Corporate Office
State Youth And Sports Centre
Karnataka Institute of Cricket
Century Club
Karnataka Examinations Authority
Home Guards & Civil Defence Academy
Bangalore Hockey Stadium
Kanteerava Indoor Stadium
M. Chinnaswamy Stadium
Bangalore Football Stadium
High Court of Karnataka
Manekshaw Parade Grounds

Tallest buildings

Under construction or planned

Consulates 
  Consulate-General of Japan
  Consulate-General of Israel
  Consulate-General of Germany
  Consulate-General of Switzerland
  Deputy High Commission and Trade Office of United Kingdom
  Consulate General of Canada
  Consulate- General of France
  Consulate-General of Ireland
  Consulate- General of Netherlands

Hotels 
Le Méridien Bangalore
Sterlings Mac Hotel Bangalore
Shangri La
Radisson Blu
Taj West End
Vivianta by Taj
JW Mariott
Hilton Embassy Golf Links
The Leela Palace
Conrad
Four Seasons Hotel
Oberoi Hotel
Royal Orchid
Ritz-Carlton Bangalore
Oakwood Premier Prestige
ITC Gardenia
Hotel IBIS
Hyatt MG Road
St. Marks Hotel
The Lalit Ashok
Sheraton Grand
The Chancery Pavilion
Adarsh Hamilton

Gallery

References

Geography of Bangalore
Central business districts in India